Roland Clara (born 8 March 1982 in Bruneck) is an Italian cross-country skier who has competed since 2002. He finished 36th in the 50 km event at the 2010 Winter Olympics in Vancouver.

Clara's best finish at the FIS Nordic World Ski Championships was fourth in the 4 × 10 km relay at Liberec in 2009 while his best individual finish was third in the 15 km individual event in Sjusjoen.

Cross-country skiing results
All results are sourced from the International Ski Federation (FIS).

Olympic Games

World Championships

World Cup

Season standings

Individual podiums
1 victory – (1 ) 
7 podiums – (2 , 5 )

Team podiums

3 podiums – (3 )

References

External links 
 
 
 

1982 births
Cross-country skiers at the 2010 Winter Olympics
Cross-country skiers at the 2014 Winter Olympics
Germanophone Italian people
Italian male cross-country skiers
Tour de Ski skiers
Living people
Olympic cross-country skiers of Italy
Sportspeople from Bruneck